The 1988 Asian Wrestling Championships were held in Islamabad, Pakistan. The event took place from December 12 to December 16, 1988.

Medal table

Team ranking

Medal summary

Men's freestyle

References

External links 
UWW Database

Asia
Asian Wrestling Championships
1988 in Pakistani sport
International wrestling competitions hosted by Pakistan